Dimitrije Grgić (born 22 June 1984) is a Serbian sports shooter. He competed in the men's 10 metre air pistol event at the 2016 Summer Olympics.

References

External links
 

1984 births
Living people
Serbian male sport shooters
Olympic shooters of Serbia
Shooters at the 2016 Summer Olympics
European Games competitors for Serbia
Sportspeople from Belgrade
ISSF pistol shooters
Shooters at the 2015 European Games
Shooters at the 2019 European Games